San Filippo may refer to:
 San Filippo syndrome, rare autosomal recessive lysosomal storage disease
 San Filippo del Mela, comune in the Metropolitan City of Messina in the Italian region Sicily
 San Filippo, Matelica, a Baroque-style, Roman Catholic church and monastery in the city of Matelica, province of Macerata, region of Marche, Italy

See also

 Sanfilippo
 San Filippo Neri (disambiguation)